Charles Barraud (19 April 1897 – 29 January 1997) was a Swiss painter from the canton of Neuchâtel.

Biography 
Barraud was born at La Chaux-de-Fonds, eldest of several brothers, the sons of an engraver of watchplates, at least four of whom became artists. Between 1910 and 1914 Charles followed an apprenticeship as an engraver while attending the art school of La Chaux-de-Fonds in the evenings, as did his brothers. When his father became ill in 1918 he worked with his brothers in the local workshops, then spent some time in Geneva with Albert Locca. In 1921 he was awarded a state scholarship in fine arts. In 1926 he opened a picture framing business and married his first wife, Jeanne Pellet (known as Janebé). Their daughter Marie-Louise (Malou) was born in 1930.

After some time spent in Tunisia in 1935 he obtained a second state grant in 1936 and in the following year visited Algeria. From 1940, when he moved to Areuse, he had several very productive years before moving to Cortaillod in 1946.

In 1951, he married his second wife, Paulette Kühni. In the same year he took part in a joint exhibition of works by the four Barraud brothers in Paris (repeated in 1961 at La Chaux-de-Fonds) and bought a house in Blauzac. After several exhibitions, including a retrospective at the Musée des beaux-arts of La Chaux-de-Fonds in 1958, he made another visit to Algeria in 1973 and to Tunisia in 1989. His last paintings date from 1995.

He died in hospital at Yverdon-les-Bains in 1997.

See also
Aimé Barraud
François Barraud

Notes and references

Sources 
 Comtesse, Gérald, 1997: Charles Barraud, Éditions Gilles Attinger: Hauterive
 Éditions Gilles Attinger 

1897 births
1997 deaths
People from La Chaux-de-Fonds
20th-century Swiss painters
20th-century Swiss male artists
Swiss male painters